Bilambil Heights is a town located in north-eastern New South Wales, Australia, in the Tweed Shire.

Demographics 
In the 2016 Census, Bilambil Heights recorded a population of 3,364 people, 50.8% female and 49.2% male.

The median age of the Bilambil Heights population was 39 years, 2 years above the national median of 37.

79.2% of people living in Bilambil Heights were born in Australia. The other top responses for country of birth were England 5.7%, New Zealand 4.1%, Germany 0.8%, Scotland 0.7%, United States of America 0.5%, 11% other countries.

93.7% of people spoke only English at home; the next most common languages were 0.7% German, 0.3% French, 0.3% Italian, 0.3% Spanish, 0.2% Japanese, 1.8% other languages.

References 

Suburbs of Tweed Heads, New South Wales